Hefei Beicheng railway station is a railway station in Hefei North City New Area, Changfeng County, Hefei, Anhui, China.

The station is sited north of the city. The future Line 8 on the Hefei Metro is expected to stop here.

History 
The station opened in 2012 and has seen little use as the surrounding area hasn't been developed. In 2018, only two services per day called at this station. In January 2019, the number of services per day was increased to 6.

On 1 December 2019, the Shangqiu–Hangzhou high-speed railway opened.

References 

Railway stations in Anhui
Railway stations in China opened in 2012